Major Harry Barnes (5 December 1870 – 12 October 1935) was a radical United Kingdom Liberal Party politician, architect and author specialising in housing and town planning.

He first stood for parliament in 1918 when he was selected as the Liberal candidate for Newcastle upon Tyne East. He had served as a Major in the Northumberland Fusiliers Voluntary Regiment. He had been the District Valuer for Newcastle upon Tyne from 1916–1918, so knew the town well. The seat was a newly created constituency and his prospects of winning were helped when no Unionist opponent came forward and he was endorsed by the Coalition Government led by David Lloyd George;  

Despite being elected as a supporter of the government, Barnes resigned the Coalition Liberal Whip in November 1919 to take the opposition Liberal Whip. In parliament Barnes was associated with the more radical wing of the Liberals, due to his support for a number of social reforms. In particular he favoured the introduction of a Capital levy which in 1919 put him at odds with the caretaker Liberal Leader Sir Donald Maclean. Radical Liberals had proposed a Commons motion to introduce a capital levy which MacLean had failed to support. Barnes publicly criticised MacLean at that year's National Liberal Federation conference.

He was strong supporter of Free Trade and served as Honorary secretary of the Cobden Club from 1920–1924. At the 1922 election he sought re-election again as the official Liberal candidate. Although he did not have a Unionist opponent, he found he was also opposed by a National Liberal supporter of the recently deposed Prime Minister, Lloyd George. This had the effect of splitting the Liberal vote with unfortunate consequences;

In December 1922 his successful Labour opponent died causing a by-election. He was again selected as the Liberal candidate. By then relations between Lloyd George and Asquith were improving and he faced no National Liberal candidate. However, a Unionist candidate intervened in the by-election with the same effect;

He decided to try his luck elsewhere and stood in Tynemouth at the 1923 general election. Tynemouth had been a Unionist seat since they gained it from the Liberals in 1918. He did well, but not quite well enough; 

He contested Tynemouth again at the 1924 election, but in a difficult year for the Liberal Party his return to parliament was again thwarted;

He was also involved in local government politics in London. He served as an Alderman on the London County Council from 1923–1925, for the Liberal backed Progressive Party.

In September 1927 Barnes was selected as Liberal prospective parliamentary candidate for the Unionist seat of Warwick and Leamington. However, he was not called upon to contest the seat at an election. In 1928, Barnes instead contested a July by-election in the West Yorkshire seat of Halifax, following the resignation of the Speaker of the House of Commons, John Henry Whitley, who had represented the seat as Liberal since 1900. This seemed to represent his best chance of returning to parliament but he was to be disappointed;

He did not stand for Parliament again.

At the 1934 LCC Elections he stood as a Labour candidate at Fulham East and was elected. He served as Chairman of the LCC's Town Planning Committee. However, he served on the LCC for little more than a year before his death.

Publications
He had published a number of publications on social matters;
Housing, the Facts and the Future, 1923
The Architect in Practice, 1924
A National Municipal House Service, 1924
Rating and Valuation, 1928
The Slum, its Story and Solution, 1931
The Rating of Coal Mines, 1933

External links 
 
 The National Portrait Gallery: http://www.npg.org.uk/collections/search/person/mp62409/harry-barnes
 The Times Obituary: http://find.galegroup.com/ttda/infomark.do?&source=gale&prodId=TTDA&userGroupName=esusslib&tabID=T003&docPage=article&searchType=BasicSearchForm&docId=CS336670030&type=multipage&contentSet=LTO&version=1.0

References 

1870 births
1935 deaths
Liberal Party (UK) MPs for English constituencies
UK MPs 1918–1922
Labour Party (UK) politicians
Members of London County Council